Khanpur Tehsil may refer to the tehsils headquartered in any of the following towns or cities:
 Khanpur, Rahim Yar Khan, in Punjab, Pakistan
 Khanpur Tehsil, Khyber Pakhtunkhwa, in Pakistan
 Khanpur, Sindh, in Pakistan
 Khanpur, Jhalawar, in Rajasthan, India

See also 
 Khanpur (disambiguation)